Bethlehem Township is one of the seventeen townships of Stark County, Ohio, United States.  The 2000 census found 4,210 people in the township.

Geography
Located in the southwestern part of the county, it borders the following townships:
Perry Township - north
Canton Township - northeast corner
Pike Township - east
Lawrence Township, Tuscarawas County - southeast
Franklin Township, Tuscarawas County - southwest
Sugar Creek Township - west
Tuscarawas Township - northwest corner

Most of the village of Navarre is located in northwestern Bethlehem Township. A very small portion of the city of Massillon also lies within the northwest portion of the township. The township also contains the unincorporated community of Smoketown within its east central portion.

Name and history
Statewide, the only other Bethlehem Township is located in Coshocton County.

Bethlehem Township was described in 1833 as having two stores and two sawmills.

Government

The township is governed by a three-member board of trustees, who are elected in November of odd-numbered years to a four-year term beginning on the following January 1. Two are elected in the year after the presidential election and one is elected in the year before it. There is also an elected township fiscal officer, who serves a four-year term beginning on April 1 of the year after the election, which is held in November of the year before the presidential election. Vacancies in the fiscal officership or on the board of trustees are filled by the remaining trustees.

References

External links
County website

Townships in Stark County, Ohio
Townships in Ohio